Mohamed Sesay (born February 22, 1984 in Freetown, Sierra Leone) is a Sierra Leonean international footballer, who currently plays for A.S.D. Tagliacozzo.

International 
In 2007 national team coach John Sherington called on Sesay to play for Sierra Leone, in the qualification matches for the African Cup of Nations, first on 12 October against Benin, and on 17 October against Guinea-Bissau.

Privates 
Sesay is the cousin of Mohamed Kallon.

Notes

1984 births
Sierra Leonean footballers
Living people
Pro Sulmona Calcio 1921 players
Expatriate footballers in Italy
Association football midfielders